This article displays the qualifying draw of the 2011 Bet-at-home Cup Kitzbühel.

Players

Seeds

Qualifiers

Qualifying draw

First qualifier

Second qualifier

Third qualifier

Fourth qualifier

References
 Qualifying Draw

2011 - qualifying
Bet-at-Home Cup - qualifying